The Consett Iron Company Ltd was an industrial business based in the Consett area of County Durham in the United Kingdom. The company owned coal mines and limestone quarries, and manufactured iron and steel. It was registered on 4 April 1864 as successor to the Derwent & Consett Iron Company Ltd. This in turn was the successor to the Derwent Iron Company, founded in 1840.

The company's seven collieries and various coke ovens came into the ownership of the National Coal Board, when British coal companies were nationalised in 1947. The Consett Iron Company itself was nationalised in 1951, becoming part of the Iron and Steel Corporation of Great Britain. It was denationalised shortly afterwards, then renationalised in 1967. The Consett Iron Company was absorbed into British Steel Corporation in 1967, and the location became known as the Consett Steel Works. British Steel Consett Works was closed in 1980.

Early history 
In 1840 a group of local businessmen led by Jonathan Richardson set up the first of several iron companies in Consett (County Durham), the Derwent Iron Company, to quarry and smelt ironstone around the town. The best local ironstone (with the highest iron content) was exhausted soon after, so the company arranged for extensions to the local railways, such as the Stockton and Darlington Railway. These allowed it to access new sources of ironstone, including, from 1851 onwards, ore from the Cleveland Ironstone Formation near Eston, Cleveland.

By 1857, Consett Iron Company owed the failed Northumberland and Durham District Bank almost a million pounds. It was put up for sale, but an attempted sale to the newly formed Derwent and Consett Iron Company fell through. On 4 April 1864, after operating for several years under the threat of bankruptcy, a new Consett Iron Company Ltd was formed with capital of £400,000. This was divided into 40,000 shares priced initially at £10 each, with J. Priestman as managing director. Two local Members of Parliament, Henry Fenwick and John Henderson, were among the directors. It became the owner of 18 blast furnaces. The company had the capacity to produce 80,000 tons of pig iron and 50,000 tons of finished iron per year. It also owned a thousand workers' cottages and 500 acres of land.

Success under William Jenkins 

William Jenkins was Consett Iron Company's general manager from 1869 to 1894. Under his leadership, the company experienced sustained profit for the first time, despite severe fluctuations in market conditions, such as the industrial depression that took place from the late 1870s to the early 1890s. The company retained what at the time were large amounts of capital, rather than distributing money to shareholders. As a result it relied less on loans to survive business cycles and had lower interest rates when it did borrow.  He also provided workers with schools, churches, a park, hospital, and other facilities. He died in 1895. The company's share of the British steel market reached a peak of 7.1% in 1894, falling to 4.2% by 1910. Business historians H.W. Richardson and J.M. Bass praised Jenkins's business judgement and choice of managers.

Around 1876, railways around the world began to use steel, instead of malleable iron, for rails. As a result, production at Consett fell by a third. The company switched production to iron plates, demand for which was rising rapidly for shipbuilding. In 1882, Consett Iron Company began to switch production again, this time to steel plates for shipbuilding using the Siemens-Martin process. This uses open hearth furnaces to convert pig iron to steel by burning off excess carbon. The first Siemens furnaces at Consett came into production in 1883. In 1887 the company began to produce steel in a variety of cross-sections, such as angle (L-section) steel, rolled joists and girders for shipbuilding. For this purpose it created the Angle Mills on a sixteen-acre site, able to produce 1,500 tons of angles, bars and girders per week.

By 1889, the Angle Mills site was the largest steel plate factory in the world. In 1892, in addition to steelmaking, the company had a foundry (a mile from Consett at Crookhall) capable of making 150 tons of iron castings per week, and a brickworks capable of making around 12,000 bricks per week. The estate had grown to roughly 2,700 workers' cottages. The company ran a 16-bed infirmary to treat injured workers. The 6,000 workers were paid an average of £5.33 a month. The company continually invested in modern equipment, such as a Roots blower (a powerful air pump) that was acquired in 1893.

Twentieth century 
William Jenkins was succeeded by the manager under him, George Ainsworth, who served as general manager from 1851 until his death in 1894. The company initially remained in profit, but its equipment and technology was not updated due to the lack of available space at Consett; a move was considered but rejected. The company did not switch to electrical power as others had and its technology became obsolete.

By 1924, the company had share capital of £3,500,000 (£185 million in 2013 terms); it had also issued £1,500,000 (£74 million in 2013 terms) in debenture stock in May 1922. In 1938, the company helped to finance the founding of the New Jarrow Steel Company from the old Palmers Shipbuilding and Iron Company which had collapsed in 1933, leading to the Jarrow March of 1936. The Consett Iron Company continued production during the Second World War using lower quality iron ore. It employed about 12,000 workers at that time.

In 1947 all of Consett Iron Company's coal mines were nationalised, coming under the control of the National Coal Board. In 1951, the rest of the Consett Iron Company was nationalised by Clement Attlee's Labour government into the short-lived Iron and Steel Corporation of Great Britain, along with all of Britain's steelworks. The Consett steelworks was privatised in 1955, and a new steel plate mill was opened in 1961 to supply the shipbuilding industry. About 6000 workers were employed at the works at that time.

Consett Steel Works was renationalised in 1967, this time by Harold Wilson's government, into the British Steel Corporation, at a time when iron, coal and shipbuilding were all in steady decline in Britain. By this time British steel had grown complacent, was running below capacity and was using obsolete technology. Raw material costs for coal and oil were rising and it lacked capital for new  manufacturing equipment. Government policy to keep employment artificially high increased the organisation's difficulties.

Closure 

Amidst intense debate and large demonstrations by workers and sympathizers, Consett Steel Works was closed in 1980. Around 3,000 to 4,000 workers lost their jobs, resulting in an unemployment rate of 35% in Consett, twice the national average at the time.

The sky over Consett, which had long been famous for its thick haze of red iron oxide dust thrown up by the steelworks, cleared as did the cloud of steam typically found around the tall cooling towers and chimneys. Some Consett steel workers took part in the demolition.

Almost all traces of the Consett steelworks have been removed. Only the Terra Novalis sculptures (pictured), made with materials from the site, recall past industry. Employment gradually returned to the area in the following decade, with a more diversified industrial base.

Notes

References

Sources

 Jenkins, William. Description of the Consett Iron Works. Mawson, Swan and Morgan, Newcastle upon Tyne, 1892. Reprinted as Consett Iron Works in 1893. Ad Publishing, 2008.
 Richardson, H. W., Bass, J. M. The Profitability of Consett Iron Company Before 1914. Business History, Vol. 7, Issue 2, 1965. Pages 71–93. DOI: 10.1080/00076797400000015.
 in Tucker, Kenneth A. Business History: Selected Readings, Routledge, 1977.
 Wilson, A. S. The Consett Iron Company Limited: a case study in Victorian business history, PhD rhesis, Durham University, 1973.

Further reading

 Garside, W. R. "Consett Iron, 1840–1980: a Study in Industrial Location"; Business History; 1 October 1991.

External links

General

 Iron Company - Science & Society Picture Library
 Consett Iron Company Ltd - The National Archives, 1951–53, Ref BE 2/61

Children's
 Timeline History of Consett Iron Works - Challenging History

Ironworks and steelworks in England
Steel companies of the United Kingdom
Defunct manufacturing companies of the United Kingdom
Companies based in County Durham
History of County Durham
Former nationalised industries of the United Kingdom
Manufacturing companies established in 1864
Manufacturing companies disestablished in 1980
1864 establishments in England
1980 disestablishments in England
Companies formerly listed on the London Stock Exchange
Consett
British companies disestablished in 1980
British companies established in 1864